Sittichai Sangkhachot (born 20 August 1987 in Bangkok) is a Thai beach volleyball player. He competed at the 2012 Asian Beach Games in Haiyang, China

References

1987 births
Living people
Sittichai Sangkhachot
Sittichai Sangkhachot
Beach volleyball players at the 2010 Asian Games
Beach volleyball players at the 2014 Asian Games
Sittichai Sangkhachot
Sittichai Sangkhachot